The following are the football (soccer) events of the year 1913 throughout the world.

Events
Maccabi Haifa is founded.
Vålerenga Fotball is founded.
Woolwich Arsenal move from the Manor Ground in Plumstead to the new Arsenal Stadium in Highbury. The same year they are also relegated to the Football League Second Division.
Easington Colliery A.F.C. is founded.
Parma is founded on 16 December.
PSV Eindhoven is founded.
Valenciennes FC is founded.
A.S. Bisceglie is founded.

Winners club national championship
Argentina: Racing Club, Estudiantes LP
Austria: Rapid Vienna
Belgium: Union Saint-Gilloise
Denmark: Kjøbenhavns Boldklub
England: Sunderland F.C.
France: Cercle Athlétique de Paris
Germany: VfB Leipzig
Hungary: Ferencváros
Iceland: Fram
Italy: Pro Vercelli
Netherlands: Sparta Rotterdam
Paraguay: Cerro Porteño
Scotland: For fuller coverage, see 1912-13 in Scottish football.
Scottish Division One – Rangers
Scottish Division Two – Ayr United
Scottish Cup – Falkirk
Sweden: Örgryte IS
Uruguay: CA River Plate
Greece: 1913 to 1921 - no championship titles due to the First World War and the Greco-Turkish War of 1919-1922.

International tournaments
1913 British Home Championship (January 18 – April 5, 1913)

Births
 June 20 – Arne Nyberg, Swedish international footballer (died 1970)
 July 14 – René Llense, French international footballer (died 2014)
 August 11 – Andy Beattie, Scottish international footballer and manager (died 1983)
 September 25 – Josef Bican, Austrian and Czechoslovak international footballer and manager (died 2001)

Deaths

References 

 
Association football by year